Belogorsky may refer to:
Belogorsky, Arkhangelsk Oblast, a settlement in Belogorsky Selsoviet of Kholmogorsky District of Arkhangelsk Oblast, Russia
Belogorsky District, a district of Amur Oblast, Russia
Belogorsky Convent, a friary in Perm Krai, Russia

See also
Belogorsky (rural locality), a list of rural localities in Russia